Coptotriche splendida is a moth of the family Tischeriidae. It was described by Annette Frances Braun in 1972. It is found in the US state of California.

The larvae feed on Rubus ursinus. They mine the leaves of their host plant.

References

Moths described in 1972
Tischeriidae